Neptec Design Group is an Ottawa-based Canadian vision systems company that provides machine vision solutions for space, industrial, and military applications. Privately owned and founded in 1990, Neptec supplies operational systems to NASA's Space Shuttle and International Space Station programs as one of their prime contractors. In 2000, Neptec expanded its technology to include active 3D imaging systems and 3D processing software. This led to the development of the Laser Camera System, an operational system used by NASA to inspect a shuttle's external surfaces during flight. Neptec also used this system to develop the TriDAR, a 3D imaging and tracking system designed for automated on-orbit rendezvous, inspection, and docking. It combines the LCS with a long range LIDAR sensor into the same optical path.

On July 18 2018, Neptec Design Group was purchased for $32 million (CAD) by a subsidiary of Maxar Technologies, MacDonald, Dettwiler and Associates.

Laser Camera System
The Laser Camera System (LCS) is a short-range, high-precision autosynchronous triangulation sensor. The camera uses a laser to measure the distance between itself and points on a target and is able to create a three-dimensional representation of the area it has scanned.

First demonstrated on the Shuttle Discovery Mission STS-105 in August 2001, Neptec's prototype LCS was the first dual target tracking and imaging three-dimensional scanner to fly in space. In 2004, after the Space Shuttle Columbia disaster, NASA required a means to determine the amount of damage, if any, sustained by a shuttle during the launch phase to ensure the safety of future missions. In response to this requirement, Neptec Design Group developed the Laser Camera System (LCS) in 14 months. The LCS made its first mission in July 2005 on NASA's STS-114 Return to Flight shuttle mission and was a mandatory system for subsequent shuttle missions.

For these missions, the LCS was part of a larger sensor system installed on a 50-foot boom extension that provided additional reach for the Remote Manipulator System (Canadarm). This Orbiter Boom Sensor System (OBSS) was used to inspect areas of the shuttle that were previously not visible to the astronauts inside. The LCS was used to survey and delineate the underside of the shuttle while in orbit. It was able to detect cracks or holes less than a millimeter thick while scanning the shuttle's tiles and panels from a distance. Since it scanned three-dimensionally, it was also able to measure the depth of any breakage identified from a scan. The scanner then sent these measurements to Earth where the data was analyzed in detail by Neptec engineers in NASA's Mission Control Center in Houston, Texas.  During STS-114, critical on-orbit data was often processed and in the hands of the Space Shuttle mission managers within an hour of being collected on orbit.

Neptec's LCS continued to fly as an operational part of the OBSS on the remaining Space Shuttle Missions.

Neptec LCS Missions:

Space Shuttle program
Spacecraft instruments
Space imagers
Engineering companies of Canada
Technology companies established in 1990
Technology companies of Canada
Companies based in Ottawa
1990 establishments in Ontario